Qaleh-ye Sheykh (also Romanized as Qal‘eh-ye Sheykh; also known as Qal‘eh) is a village in Dastjerd Rural District, Gugan District, Azarshahr County, East Azerbaijan Province, Iran. At the 2006 census, its population was 196, in 53 families.

References 

Populated places in Azarshahr County